Si Kak Sao Chingcha is an intersection in San Chao Pho Suea and Sao Chingcha with Wat Ratchabophit sub-districts, Phra Nakhon district, Bangkok.  It is the four-way intersection of Thanao, Bamrung Mueang and Fueang Nakhon roads. It is the beginning of Thanao Road and from this point one can clearly see the Giant Swing from the side of Bamrung Mueang Road.

Si Kak Sao Chingcha is considered one of two intersections in Bangkok, that still has the term "Si Kak" preceding the title, alike nearby Si Kak Phraya Si (สี่กั๊กพระยาศรี). Both are connected by Fueang Nakhon, the road is only 0.5 km (about 0.3 mi) long, and the road was built along Charoen Krung with Bamrung Mueang since the reign of King Mongkut (Rama IV).  All three roads are the first formal roads in Thailand.

The term "Si Kak" is a Teochew dialect meaning "four-way intersection" and "Sao Chingcha" (เสาชิงช้า)  is a Thai word that refers to Giant Swing, a Hindu religious structure in front of Wat Suthat. In the past, there was also a Triyampawai ceremony during Songkran festival at the Giant Swing. The ceremony procession will begin at this intersection. 

The area around Si Kak Sao Chingcha is full of old historic shophouses. It consists of Rolex dealer, old teahouse, Buddha statue and idol foundries with devotional souvenir shops, restaurants, the Siam Commercial Bank branch of the Si Kak Sao Chingcha, including the building of the Ministry of Interior as well.

Besides, the nearby on Thanao side are three-ways separated from the main road, which called "Sam Praeng" (สามแพร่ง; lit: three crossroads). Its name is based on the three members of the royal family. They all have a palace in the Sam Praeng's area. Sam Praeng is considered one of the most historic and architectural values of Bangkok. It is home to shophouses built with Sino-Portuguese architecture, modeled from Singapore since the reign of King Vajiravudh (Rama VI).

References 

Neighbourhoods of Bangkok
Phra Nakhon district
Road junctions in Bangkok